The convex-vented horned toad (Xenophrys pachyproctus), also known as the Gelin spadefoot toad or Huang's spadefoot toad, is a species of frog in the family Megophryidae. It is found in Tibet (China) and northern Vietnam, and possibly in India. Its natural habitats are subtropical or tropical moist montane forests and rivers.

Xenophrys pachyproctus is a small toad, measuring only  in length.

References

Xenophrys
Amphibians of China
Amphibians of Vietnam
Taxonomy articles created by Polbot
Amphibians described in 1981